Junodia hararensis is a species of praying mantis found in Ethiopia and Somalia.

See also
List of mantis genera and species

References

Junodia
Insects of Ethiopia
Fauna of Somalia
Mantodea of Africa
Insects described in 1972